was a Japanese music composer for video games and anime. He was a member of Twin Amadeus, who composed songs for the Beatmania IIDX series of music video games. He died in September 2006 due to liver cancer, at the age of forty-six years.

Composition and arrangement

Games
 Jumping Flash! (1995)
 Jumping Flash! 2 (1996)
 Robbit Mon Dieu (1999)
 Pocket MuuMuu (1999)
 The Legend of Dragoon (1999)
 Chase the Express (2000)

Anime
 Violence Jack: Hell's Wind (1990)
 Abashiri Family (1991)
 Eiyuu Gaiden Mozaicka (1991)
 Idol Defense Force Hummingbird (1993)
 Battle Skipper (1995)
 Ninja Cadets (1996)
 Detatoko Princess (1997)
 Himitsu no Akko-chan (1998)
 Itsumo Kokoro ni Taiyō o! (1999)
 Saikano (2002)

References

External links
 
 

1960 births
2006 deaths
20th-century Japanese composers
20th-century Japanese male musicians
Anime composers
Deaths from liver cancer
Japanese composers
Japanese film score composers
Japanese male composers
Japanese male film score composers
Video game composers